Congress for Democratic Change (abbreviated CDC) is a Liberian political party formed by supporters of George Weah's 2005 presidential campaign.

History
In the 11 October 2005 elections, Weah placed first in the presidential poll, winning 28.3% of the vote. He was defeated by Ellen Johnson Sirleaf of the Unity Party in the 8 November  run-off election, winning 40.6% of the vote compared to Johnson-Sirleaf's 59.4%. In the 2017 presidential election, the party was the largest component of the Coalition for Democratic Change, and won the presidency under Weah.

The party won 3 seats in the Senate and 15 in the House of Representatives.

Electoral history

Presidential elections

House of Representatives elections

Senate elections

References

External links
CDC official website

Political parties in Liberia
Political parties with year of establishment missing